The West Twin  River is a stream on the Olympic Peninsula in the U.S. state of Washington. It originates in the northern Olympic Mountains and flows north, emptying into the Strait of Juan de Fuca just east of East Twin River.

Course
The West Twin River originates in the Olympic National Forest in the northern portion of Olympic Peninsula.

See also
 List of rivers of Washington

References

Rivers of Washington (state)
Rivers of Clallam County, Washington